Masoud Moradi Bastani (born 12 May 1978 in Arak) is an Iranian reformist journalist. Throughout his career, he was arrested several times, the last of which was on July 5, 2009, during protests after the disputed Iranian presidential election. He was then given a six-year prison term. Since his arrest, he has never been allowed to leave the prison and there are serious concerns about his health.

See also
 Human rights in Iran

References

1978 births
Iranian journalists
Iranian democracy activists
Living people
People from Arak, Iran